The Public Accountability Initiative (PAI) is an American nonprofit watchdog organization investigating corporate and government accountability. Founded in 2008 and based in Buffalo, New York, it operates the volunteer-run online database LittleSis, described by its co-founder "an involuntary Facebook for influential people". LittleSis, a play on the authoritarian Big Brother from George Orwell's dystopian novel Nineteen Eighty-Four, was funded by a grant from the Sunlight Foundation and launched in January, 2009. By August of that year it included profiles and financial information on over 28,000 individuals and 10,000 organizations.

References

External links

LittleSis.org

Organizations established in 2008
Non-profit organizations based in New York (state)
Organizations based in Buffalo, New York